Atbasar District is a district of Akmola Region in northern Kazakhstan. The administrative center of the district is the town of Atbasar. Population:

References

Districts of Kazakhstan
Akmola Region